Chemistry International is a news magazine published by the International Union of Pure and Applied Chemistry (IUPAC). According to its website, it was published in editions covering two months at a time. In 2017 the magazine began to be published quarterly.

References

Chemistry journals
News magazines published in Europe
Magazines published in Boston
Magazines published in Switzerland
Magazines established in 1979
Science and technology magazines
Quarterly magazines